Landsborough Highway is a highway in western Queensland, Australia, running in the northwest–southeast direction from Morven to Cloncurry. The Landsborough Highway runs through vast tracts of land that was once occupied by William Landsborough, an Australian explorer of the 19th century. It is also the central part of the tourist route known as the Matilda Way after the popular Australian song Waltzing Matilda, which extends from Bourke in central northern New South Wales to Karumba on the Gulf of Carpentaria.

The entire highway is an important part of the National Highway system linking Darwin and Brisbane: formerly National Route 66 (Cloncurry to Barcaldine) and National Route 71 (Barcaldine to Augathella), Queensland began to convert to the alphanumeric system much of Australia had adopted in the early-2000s and is now designated as National Route A2. Its importance also stems from the fact that it is the only sealed link between Flinders Highway and Capricorn Highway apart from Gregory Development Road between Emerald and Charters Towers.

The highway services an important sheep and cattle grazing region, tourist traffic and local properties. The highway is fully sealed but with many sections of substandard width and quality. It is also flood-prone with lengthy closures during floods.

Northern Australia Roads Program upgrade
The Northern Australia Roads Program announced in 2016 included the following project for the Landsborough Highway.

Pavement widening and strengthening
The project for pavement widening and strengthening between Longreach and Winton (Package 1) was completed in early 2020 at a total cost of $27 million.

Roads of strategic importance upgrade
The Roads of Strategic Importance initiative, last updated in March 2022, included the following project for the Landsborough Highway.

Corridor upgrade
A lead project to upgrade the Mount Isa to Rockhampton corridor, including sections of the Landsborough and Capricorn Highways and surrounding state and council roads, at an estimated cost of $237.5 million, was in the planning and scoping stage. Works are expected to include progressive sealing, lane duplications and crossing upgrades.

Other upgrades

Pavement strengthening and widening

Towns
Towns along the highway are listed below:
 Augathella
 Tambo
 Blackall
 Barcaldine
 Longreach
 Winton
 Kynuna
 McKinlay
 Cloncurry

Major intersections

See also

 Highways in Australia
 List of highways in Queensland

References

Highways in Queensland
North West Queensland
Central West Queensland